Podoleni is a commune in Neamț County, Western Moldavia, Romania. It is composed of two villages, Negritești and Podoleni.

Demographics

Population 
The 2011 Romanian census puts the population of Podoleni at 4,196. This is in comparison to the 2002 census which recorded the population at 5,628. The majority of the population are ethnically Romanian (96.5%), the remaining population's ethnicity is unknown (3.43%).

Religion

Geography 
The commune lays 25.6 km away from the Piatra Neamţ municipality, which is the capital of the Neamţ County. The commune is 4,017 hectares in area, the majority of which is dedicated to agricultural use. Only 885 hectares is designated for "town" use.

History 
The village of Podoleni was founded on the bank of the Bistrița river. The villages is first attested in 1479. The Buciuleşti monastery was erected in 1630, and has since fallen in to ruin.

References

Communes in Neamț County
Localities in Western Moldavia